Carmel Jean Sepuloni (born 1977) is a New Zealand politician and a Member of Parliament for the Labour Party who has been the deputy prime minister of New Zealand since 25 January 2023. She was first elected to Parliament following the 2008 general election as a list member, becoming New Zealand's first MP of Tongan descent.

In the 2011 general election, Sepuloni won the seat of Waitakere on the official count with an eleven-vote majority over incumbent National MP Paula Bennett, who subsequently requested a judicial recount, which resulted in Sepuloni losing her seat in Parliament. She returned to Parliament in 2014 as the member for Kelston.

Early years
Sepuloni was born and raised in Waitara, Taranaki, and attended New Plymouth Girls' High School. She moved to Auckland in 1996 to attend the Auckland College of Education and University of Auckland where she attained a Diploma of Teaching (Primary), and a Bachelor of Education respectively. She also holds a Post Graduate Diploma in Education. Her father was a Samoan- Tongan migrant freezing worker, who migrated to New Zealand without being able to speak English, and 'staunch unionist' and her mother was a Pākehā from a conservative farming family. She has two sons. She married writer and musician Daren Kamali in November 2018. Before entering politics, Sepuloni was a teacher, with teaching experience in Samoa and with Auckland Youth in alternative education programmes; an equity manager; and a research project manager in Pacific health at the University of Auckland.

Member of Parliament

First term, 2008–2011
Sepuloni came to Parliament in the 2008 general election as a list MP for Labour. She was ranked 35 on the party's list and did not stand in any electorate. The promotion of Sepuloni and others was cited by The New Zealand Herald as an effort by the Labour Party to "inject new faces" and increase the party's ethnic diversity.

After the election, Sepuloni became Labour's spokesperson for civil defence, and associate spokesperson for tertiary education and social development. She had been involved in the party for only a year and a half before being elected.

In her maiden speech, Sepuloni said, "I've learned through my own experiences and the experiences of others around me, that our young in particular can quickly begin to self-stigmatise when the media and society stigmatise them. When the media only portrays a picture of a ghettoised, poverty-stricken group of trouble makers, then our youth can resign themselves to the fact that this is what they are. They may even take pride in this prescribed image, because it provides them with a level of attention and status which although negative, is attention and status nonetheless."

In June 2010, Sepuloni's Employment Relations (Probationary Period Repeal) Amendment Bill was drawn from the member's ballot. A bill to repeal the changes to probationary employment contained in the Employment Relations Amendment Act 2008, it was defeated at its first reading 64 votes to 57.

Second term, 2011–2014
On 19 March 2010, Sepuloni was selected as the Labour candidate for the Waitakere electorate in the 2011 general election, facing incumbent National MP and Cabinet minister Paula Bennett. In April 2011, she was ranked number 24 on the party's list for the election. On the election night preliminary count, she placed second in Waitakere, 349 votes behind Bennett, and with her list ranking was set not to be returned to Parliament. When the official results were released on 10 December 2011, Sepuloni had received sufficient special votes to win Waitakere and defeat Bennett by eleven votes. Bennett requested a judicial recount and on 17 December regained her seat with a nine-vote majority, removing Sepuloni from Parliament. This was not before the Labour Party leadership election on 13 December, in which she participated as a member-elect of the Labour caucus. Not long after leaving Parliament Sepuloni travelled to Egypt to participate as a short-term observer on the NDI International Election Mission. Prior to being reelected, Sepuloni was employed as the chief executive for a Pacific disability, mental health, and older persons NGO called Vaka Tautua.

Third term, 2014–2017
During the 2014 general election, Sepuloni stood as Labour's candidate in the Kelston electorate in Auckland, winning by a majority of 15,091 votes.

In 2015 Sepuloni was stood down as Labour's social development spokesperson after her mother was charged with benefit fraud; her mother was subsequently sentenced to four and a half months of home detention for illegally receiving benefits totalling $34,000.

Fourth term, 2017–2020
During the 2017 general election, Sepuloni stood again in her Kelston seat, returning to Parliament with a majority of 16,789 votes. Following Labour's formation of a coalition government with New Zealand First and the Greens, Sepuloni was elected as a Cabinet minister by the Labour Party caucus. She was subsequently appointed as minister of social development and disability issues as well as associate minister of Pacific Peoples, and arts, culture & heritage.

On 28 April 2018, Sepuloni issued a statement criticizing Work and Income for turning away a homeless woman who was trying to apply for a benefit after being discharged from hospital. As social development minister, Sepuloni likened her Government's approach to welfare reform to "trying to turn a jumbo jet in mid-air."

On 22 July 2020, Sepuloni was appointed as minister for ACC following the resignation of Iain Lees-Galloway, who admitted to having an "inappropriate relationship" with a former staffer.

Fifth term, 2020–present

During the 2020 general election held on 17 October, Sepuloni was re-elected in Kelston by a final margin of 15,660 votes, retaining the seat for Labour. In early November, she retained her previous ministerial portfolios for social development (expanded to include the employment portfolio previously held by Willie Jackson), disability issues, and ACC, while also becoming the lead minister for arts, culture & heritage.

On 22 January 2023, incoming prime minister Chris Hipkins confirmed Sepuloni as his deputy prime minister as they replace the outgoing prime minister Jacinda Ardern and the outgoing deputy prime minister Grant Robertson. She is the first Pasifika deputy prime minister and third woman to hold the role.

References

|-

|-

|-

|-

1977 births
Living people
New Zealand Labour Party MPs
New Zealand people of Tongan descent
New Zealand people of Samoan descent
People educated at New Plymouth Girls' High School
University of Auckland alumni
New Zealand list MPs
Unsuccessful candidates in the 2011 New Zealand general election
Members of the New Zealand House of Representatives
New Zealand MPs for Auckland electorates
People from Waitara, New Zealand
21st-century New Zealand politicians
Candidates in the 2017 New Zealand general election
Members of the Cabinet of New Zealand
Deputy Prime Ministers of New Zealand
Women government ministers of New Zealand
Candidates in the 2020 New Zealand general election